Amanda Rose Shires (born March 5, 1982) is an American singer-songwriter and fiddle player. Shires has released seven solo albums starting in 2005, her most recent being Take It Like a Man in 2022. In 2019, she founded a country music supergroup called The Highwomen alongside Brandi Carlile, Maren Morris and Natalie Hemby and has also performed as a member of the Texas Playboys, Thrift Store Cowboys, and Jason Isbell & the 400 Unit, as well as in a duo with Rod Picott. Along with Jason Isbell & the 400 Unit, Shires won the Grammy Award for Best Americana Album for their 2017 album The Nashville Sound.

Early life
Following her parents' divorce, Shires' childhood was divided between the Texas cities of Lubbock and Mineral Wells.  Her mother is a retired nurse. She also used to be a barrel racer at rodeos. Her father owns a wholesale nursery in Mineral Wells and has a hobby of gold prospecting in Alaska.  She is distantly related to noted photographer Erica Shires, who produced the video for the song "Swimmer".

At the age of 10, she happened to be with her father while he was shopping for hunting gear at a pawn shop in Mineral Wells. She saw an inexpensive Chinese-made fiddle for sale and her father agreed to buy it for her on the condition that she learn to play it. It took a while for her to play it well; she usually practiced outside because her dog had a habit of howling while she played.  When she was 12, she started taking fiddle lessons in Lubbock from Lanny Fiel, who knew Frankie McCourter from the Texas Playboys. She then started learning fiddle from McCourter and was later invited to play at the band's shows. At the age of 15, she joined the Texas Playboys, the former backing band for Western swing legend Bob Wills.

Musical career

Shires released her first solo album, the mostly instrumental Being Brave, in 2005.  Four years later, having relocated to Nashville, she released West Cross Timbers and in the same year released Sew Your Heart with Wires, a collaboration with Rod Picott.  Her next solo album, Carrying Lightning was released in 2011, followed by Down Fell The Doves in August 2013 and My Piece of Land in September 2016. The latter proved to be Shires' breakthrough, gaining her a nomination from the Americana Music Association.

She toured extensively with Picott from 2006.  She has also performed and recorded with Jason Isbell & the 400 Unit, Devotchka, Chris Isaak, Thrift Store Cowboys, Todd Snider, and Justin Townes Earle.

In 2011 she appeared in the movie Country Strong as one of the musicians backing singer Kelly Canter, played by Gwyneth Paltrow.

In 2011, Shires began attending Sewanee: The University of the South, a small liberal arts university in Sewanee, Tennessee. She graduated with a Master's of Fine Arts in Poetry in 2017.

In 2012, Shires was named Artist of the Year by Texas Music magazine, appearing on the publication's cover.

Shires won the Emerging Artist of the Year Award at the 2017 Americana Music Honors & Awards. In 2017, she supported John Prine on his worldwide tour alongside Isbell for select dates. In 2018, Shires announced that she was working on a new album, To The Sunset due for release on August 3, 2018 which, like My Piece of Land, will be produced by Dave Cobb. Isbell revealed on Twitter that Gillian Welch and David Rawlings will make a guest appearance. As a member of the 400 Unit, Shires won the Grammy Award for Best Americana Album for The Nashville Sound. Shires contributed to The Tree of Forgiveness, the 2018 album by John Prine. To The Sunset was released on August 3, 2018.

In 2019, Shires formed the country group The Highwomen, along with Brandi Carlile, Natalie Hemby, and Maren Morris. "Redesigning Women" was the first single from their self-titled debut album released on September 6, 2019. Following 2021 holiday album For Christmas, Shires released her seventh solo album Take It Like a Man on July 26, 2022.

Musical style
David Menconi of the magazine Spin said that Shires "sings [...] like an earthbound Emmylou Harris", and her vocals have been likened to those of Dolly Parton.  The imagery in her songwriting has been compared to that of Tom Waits.  Although her principal instrument is the fiddle, she also plays the ukulele.

Personal life
Shires began dating fellow musician Jason Isbell in 2011.  The couple married on February 23, 2013 and had their first child on September 1, 2015. She was previously in a relationship with singer Rod Picott.

Discography

Solo albums
Being Brave (2005)
West Cross Timbers (2009)
Carrying Lightning (2011)
 Down Fell the Doves (2013)
My Piece of Land (2016)
To the Sunset (2018)
For Christmas (2021)
Take It Like a Man (2022)

With Rod Picott
Sew Your Heart with Wires (2009)

With Jason Isbell
Here We Rest (2011)
Southeastern (2013)
Something More Than Free (2015)
Sea Songs (2015 single)
"If I Needed You" - on Gentle Giants: The Songs of Don Williams (2017)
The Nashville Sound (2017)
Reunions (2020)
Georgia Blue (2021)

With the Highwomen
The Highwomen (2019)

Other appearances
Sweeten the Distance (2011) – Neal Casal
Nothing's Gonna Change the Way You Feel About Me Now – Justin Townes Earle
Light Fighter – Thrift Store Cowboys
Welding Burns – Rod Picott
Agnostic Hymns & Stoner Fables – Todd Snider
Oh Be Joyful – Shovels & Rope
Mutt – Cory Branan
Burn. Flicker. Die. – American Aquarium
I Can't Love You Any Less – High Cotton: Tribute to Alabama (2013)
For Better, or Worse – John Prine (2016)
Adios – Cory Branan (2017)
Accomplice One – Tommy Emmanuel (2018)
Tree of Forgiveness – John Prine (2018)
Find a Light – Blackberry Smoke (2018)
What You See Ain't Always What You Get – Luke Combs (fiddle on "Without You")

Awards and nominations

The song "When you Need a Train It Never Comes" from Carrying Lightning was ranked the fifth best song of 2011 by American Songwriter.

References

External links

 

1982 births
Living people
21st-century American singers
21st-century American violinists
American country singer-songwriters
American women country singers
ATO Records artists
People from Lubbock, Texas
Lubbock High School alumni
Singer-songwriters from Texas
Country musicians from Texas
The Highwomen members
21st-century American women singers